A cat repeller is a device or substance used to discourage cats from entering an area, or to encourage them to leave if they do enter. Such deterrents are most commonly used by gardeners, in order to prevent damage to their gardens, to avoid cat feces, or to protect birds.

Devices

Ultrasonic devices
Many retailers sell devices which exploit the discomforting effects of in-air ultrasound. These devices are usually combined with a motion sensor which is triggered by movement within the sensors range. This causes the device to emit high frequency noise which is uncomfortable to the cats, and inaudible to most humans (although they can still experience unpleasant subjective effects and, potentially, shifts in the hearing threshold). The devices are available in both battery and mains operated forms, the latter generally having a higher output, greater range and requiring less attention.

Some cats are immune to ultrasonic cat deterrents, mainly the ones which are hard of hearing. There are also reports that the devices take a while to become effective, as some cats will stand their ground in a futile attempt to make the deterrent go away. Moving the device to different locations regularly and combining with another form of cat repellent may make these devices more effective. A statistical survey into customer satisfaction levels with ultrasonic deterrents concluded that 80% of owners expressed satisfaction with the results of ultrasonic deterrent devices.

The Royal Society for the Protection of Birds (RSPB), has endorsed a commercial product called "CatWATCH", for which it receives 2% of the wholesale price of every device sold by the manufacturer. The RSPB tested the original CatWATCH device in a study using 63 and 96 volunteer observers in two long-running (18 and 33 weeks) blind experiments. Results from the study indicated that the device did have a moderate deterrent effect, reducing the probability of a previous cat intrusion into a garden by approximately 32% in the first experiment, but not in the longer running second experiment.

Scatter guns are another form of ultrasonic device. These laser-aiming devices can be targeted at cats and activated by a trigger. They will send out an ultrasonic noise directed where aimed.

Professor Timothy Leighton from the  Institute of Sound and Vibration Research, has expressed concern about the recent growth in commercial products which exploit the discomforting effects of in-air ultrasound. Leighton claims that commercial products are often advertised with cited levels which cannot be critically accepted due to lack of accepted measurement standards for ultrasound in air, and little understanding of the mechanism by which they may represent a hazard.

Electric fences
Commercially produced electric fences are available, specifically marketed to keep cats out of or within a defined area. These systems work on voltages low enough to deter but not cause harm to cats. Typically they require a physical fence too high for a cat to jump over, with an electrified wire strung along the top.
Care must be taken with the strength of electric current used.

Animals

Dogs
Canines are naturally territorial and will keep cats at bay.

Substances

Crystals
A more traditional cat repeller is to use jelly-like crystals containing methyl nonyl ketone, designed to be scattered around the garden, or around the areas the cat likes to foul. These repellents give off a smell that is very unpleasant to the cat, causing it to avoid that place.

Citronella
Citronella oil, used for repelling insects, can also be used to get rid of cats. Citronella sticks are a common form, coming in citronella-impregnated plastic "repeller sticks".

Lion dung
Although lion dung is supported by the British organisation Cats Protection to be effective in deterring cats, an episode of MythBusters found it completely ineffective as a cat repellent. In addition, an anecdotal experience reported by the BBC also found that it was not effective.

Plastic bottles
In Japan, plastic bottles are often placed outside houses because of the belief that the light from the water will reflect and stop the cats from entering the property to urinate.

References

Cat equipment
Mammal pest control